Alexej Dmitrievic Prochorow (born 30 March 1990) is a German male weightlifter. He participated at the 2016 Summer Olympics in the men's +105 kg event finishing 16th. He competed in the 2014 World Weightlifting Championships the 2015 World Weightlifting Championships in the +105 kg category.

References

External links
 
 
 
 

1990 births
Living people
German male weightlifters
Place of birth missing (living people)
Weightlifters at the 2016 Summer Olympics
Olympic weightlifters of Germany